Grace College is a private, co-educational, Christian high school located in Hilton, KwaZulu-Natal midlands.

History
The founding of Grace College came about from a demand for a more affordable school in the Hilton area. It was decided that a high school based on christian values and ethos would be established. In 1999,Grace College opened its doors. The school was built on 22 a hectare property, located in close proximity to the town of Hilton.

Overview
The school has grown to have more than 222 pupils, offering a full academic and sports programme. Due to its strong christian ethos, biblical principles and studies are incorporated into everyday learning and pupils are encouraged to approach and use this teachings in their everyday lives.

Outreach programmes
Outreach and giving back to the community has always been an important part of the school. Pupils, parents and teachers regularly perform charity for the disadvantaged surroundings areas, such as Sweetwaters & Edendale. One such outreach project is Masihambisane ("Let us move forward together"), an education workshop for teachers who teach in schools in disadvantaged areas. The school does have a number of other outreach programmes, where pupils can choose as part of their 20-hour outreach for Life Orientation. Furthermore, grade and 10 pupils visit Sbongumbovu combined school where they help learners there with mathematics and reading literacy. The whole school is then involved in a Christmas party at the end of each year. Some other outreaches that Grace College pupils are involved in are:
Free Me Wildlife Rehabilitation Centre
Sunnyside Park Home
Tabitha Ministries
Thandihouse
SPCA
Greys Hospital
Prestbury Preschool
Assisting with an entertainment area at Envande in Edendale
Grace College also gets involved with fund raising initiatives such as Sunflower Day and Tekkie Tax Day.

References

External links
 
 https://www.isasaschoolfinder.co.za/school.htm?schoolID=185

Schools in KwaZulu-Natal
1998 establishments in South Africa
Educational institutions established in 1998